The 1924–25 season was the 30th season of competitive football by Southampton, and the club's third in the Second Division of the Football League. Following the 1923–24 season, in which the club finished just three points shy of the First Division promotion places in fifth place, the Saints dropped two positions to finish seventh in the league. As with the last season, Southampton began their Second Division campaign poorly and found themselves at the bottom of the table after two losses in their first three games. The side continued to struggle to pick up wins, but steadily began making their way up the table over the next few months. A number of wins over the Christmas period and an eight-game unbeaten run at the end of the season helped Southampton finish in seventh place with 13 wins, 18 draws and 11 losses.

In the 1924–25 FA Cup, Southampton beat Third Division South sides Exeter City and Brighton & Hove Albion in the first and second rounds, respectively, followed by Second Division rivals Bradford City in the third. They then edged past four-time First Division champions Liverpool with a 1–0 win in the fourth round, before being eliminated by Sheffield United, another top-flight side, in the semi-final. United went on to win the tournament, beating Cardiff City in the final at Wembley Stadium. The club ended the season with two games against local rivals Portsmouth, for the Rowland Hospital Cup and the Hampshire Benevolent Cup, respectively. The former ended in a draw and the latter was won by Pompey. In their two friendly games of the season, the Saints drew 1–1 with Plymouth Argyle in November and March.

Southampton used 22 different players during the 1924–25 season and had eight different goalscorers. The club's top scorers were centre-forward Bill Rawlings and inside-right Arthur Dominy, both of whom scored 16 goals in all competitions (Rawlings was the top scorer in the league with 14 goals). Nine new players were signed by the club during the campaign, while six were sold to other clubs and one was loaned out for the season. The average attendance at The Dell during the 1924–25 season was 8,939. The highest attendance was 21,501 against Liverpool in the fourth round of the FA Cup; the lowest was around 4,000 against Blackpool on 1 November 1924. The season was the club's last to feature manager Jimmy McIntyre, who left in December 1924; the Southampton board subsequently took over the role.

Background and transfers
At the end of the 1923–24 season, Southampton brought in centre-half John Callagher and inside-forward Stan Woodhouse from Bury, who had just been promoted to the First Division as runners-up of the second flight. As part of the deal, left-half Bill Turner moved to the Manchester-based club, where he would remain for a total of three seasons. In a similar deal, the Saints sold full-back Harry Hooper to divisional rivals Leicester City, in exchange for right-half Dennis Jones and outside-left Fred Price. None of the four new players would become regulars in the side, however, and all but Woodhouse had left by the end of the 1924–25 season. In June, outside-left Elias MacDonald – who had joined from Burton All Saints just a year earlier – left for Third Division South side Southend United. The following month, inside-left Jock Salter also left Southampton after just one season at the club (during which he made a single appearance), joining Thornycrofts. Also in July, outside-right Tommy Broad joined from Stoke.

In August, outside-right Charlie Brown left Southampton to join Third Division South club Queens Park Rangers. Harold Pearson left around the same to join Coventry City. Manager Jimmy McIntyre brought two more players to the club before the start of the league campaign – centre-forward Jimmy Bullock signed from Crewe Alexandra in the Third Division North, while goalkeeper James Thitchener joined on amateur terms from local club Totton. The club signed another amateur in October, Bournemouth & Boscombe Athletic half-back Ernie King, who had signed professional terms by January 1925. In November, Scottish forward Willie McCall returned to his home country on loan with former club Queen of the South, who he would later join in a permanent deal. The last transfer activity of the 1924–25 season came in February 1925, when wing-half Albert Barrett joined Southampton from West Ham United, making one appearance in the Second Division before leaving for Fulham the following summer.

Players transferred in

Players transferred out

Players loaned out

Second Division

Southampton's 1924–25 season started similarly poorly to the previous campaign. After starting with a goalless draw at home to Oldham Athletic on 30 August, the team lost away games against Stoke and The Wednesday to find themselves at the bottom of the league table by 6 September. However, the team won the return fixture against Stoke 3–0 and beat Clapton Orient 2–0 the following week (all but one of the five goals scored by Arthur Dominy), quickly moving them up to the top half of the table. Southampton struggled to embark on any run of form throughout the rest of September and October, picking up five draws and three losses from their next eight games as they remained just clear of danger at the bottom of the table. November saw the side pick up two more wins – against struggling sides Blackpool and Bradford City – and in December they picked up another two with victories at home to Barnsley and Fulham. By the end of 1924, the Saints sat comfortably in the top half of the Second Division table.

In December 1924, Jimmy McIntyre left Southampton after more than 200 games during a five-year tenure as the club's manager. The board of directors subsequently began to handle managerial duties for the club, with secretary George Goss taking over the role of first team coach for the rest of the season. The team continued to occupy a mid-table position throughout early 1925, picking up wins over struggling teams such as Crystal Palace and Stockport County to remain competitive in the league, but continuing to drop points to higher-placed teams. After dropping back to 15th in the table, Southampton began an unbeaten run of eight games in April to return to the top half for the end of the season. The spell included draws with eventual champions and runners-up Leicester City and Manchester United, and culminated in wins over Bradford City and Coventry City, who finished bottom of the league. Southampton finished in seventh place with 13 wins, 18 draws and 11 losses, two places and four points lower than 1923–24.

List of match results

Final league table

Results by matchday

FA Cup

Southampton entered the 1924–25 FA Cup in the first round against Third Division South club Exeter City. The game was initially played on 10 January 1921, but with the Saints leading 5–0 through goals from Arthur Dominy (two), Cliff Price (two) and Tom Parker, it was abandoned after 80 minutes due to the foggy weather conditions. According to club historians, "some Saints fans went on to the pitch 'in an effort to let the game go on', but the referee was adamant" and the fixture was abandoned. The game was replayed four days later at The Dell, with the hosts winning 3–1 thanks to goals from Dominy, Price and Bill Rawlings. In the second round the club hosted Brighton & Hove Albion, also of the Third Division South, who they beat by a single goal following an early penalty, which was converted by Parker. Second Division rivals Bradford City travelled to The Dell for the third round fixture, with Southampton winning 2–0 through Dominy and George Harkus to advance to the quarter-finals.

In the fourth round of the tournament, Southampton – in a fourth consecutive home tie – hosted former First Division champions Liverpool, who had eliminated them in the third round the previous season following a replay at Anfield. This time the hosts were victorious in the initial meeting, with Rawlings scoring the only goal of the game to send the Saints through to their first FA Cup semi-final since the 1907–08 season. In the semi-final, Southampton faced First Division side Sheffield United at Stamford Bridge, the home ground of Chelsea. Harkus came close to opening the scoring in the first half, but "shot wide with only the goalkeeper to beat". Later in the half, Parker "sliced" the ball past his own goalkeeper Tommy Allen to put United ahead. In the second half, Parker also missed a penalty following a foul on Rawlings in the area, and before the end of the match United doubled their lead after "a mix-up" between the Saints right-back and goalkeeper, eliminating the Second Division side.

Other matches
Outside of the league and the FA Cup, Southampton played four additional first-team matches during the 1924–25 season. The first was a friendly match against Third Division South side Plymouth Argyle on 24 November 1924. The game, which took place at The Dell and was arranged as a benefit for Southampton right-back Tom Parker, ended in a 1–1 draw, with Bill Rawlings scoring for the hosts. Southampton and Argyle met again on 16 March 1925 at Home Park. The second game also ended in a 1–1 draw, with the visitors' goal scored by inside-left Cliff Price.

As usual, Southampton ended their season with two games against local rivals Portsmouth. The first meeting, for the Rowland Hospital Cup, took place on 4 May 1925 and saw home side Pompey beating the Saints 2–0. Willie Haines, who scored five goals in the three meetings between the sides the previous season, opened the scoring in the third minute, before Jerry Mackie scored the second later on. Two days later, the teams drew 1–1 in the Hampshire Benevolent Cup at The Dell. Arthur Dominy scored the equaliser for Southampton after Martin opened for Pompey.

Player details
Southampton used 22 different players during the 1924–25 season, eight of whom scored during the campaign. The team played in a 2–3–5 formation throughout the campaign, using two full-backs, three half-backs, two outside forwards, two inside forwards and a centre-forward. Right-half Bert Shelley made the most appearances during the season, playing in all but one league match. Inside-right Arthur Dominy and left-half George Harkus each missed just two league games, while centre-forward Bill Rawlings appeared in all but three. Rawlings and Dominy finished the season as the club's joint top scorers – the former scored 14 in the league and two in the FA Cup, while the latter scored 13 in the league, two in the FA Cup, and one in the Hampshire Benevolent Cup. Harkus was the club's only scoring half-back of the season, with two league goals, and right-back Tom Parker was their only scoring full-back of the season, netting in the league three times to finish third overall for the season.

Squad statistics

Most appearances

Top goalscorers

Footnotes

References

Bibliography

External links
Southampton F.C. official website

Southampton F.C. seasons
Southampton